Wakabayashi Station (若林駅) is the name of two train stations in Japan:

 Wakabayashi Station (Aichi)
 Wakabayashi Station (Tokyo)